Nicholas Wilson may refer to:

Elijah Nicholas Wilson (1842–1915), known as "The White Indian Boy"
Nick Gage (Nicholas Wilson, born 1980), professional wrestler
Nicholas Wilson (parson) (died 1548), English clergyman
Nicholas Wilson, Lord Wilson of Culworth (born 1945), British judge
Nick Wilson (field hockey) (born 1990), New Zealand field hockey player
Nick Wilson (American football) (born 1996), American football running back
Nicholas Wilson (alpine skier) (born 1960), British former alpine skier
Nick Wilson (Survivor contestant) (born 1990), Survivor: David vs. Goliath winner